Takae Itō (born June 30, 1975, in Aichi Prefecture, Japan) is a Japanese politician who has served as a member of the House of Councillors of Japan since 2016. She represents the Aichi at-large district and is a member of the Democratic Party for the People.

References 

Living people
1975 births
Politicians from Aichi Prefecture
Members of the House of Councillors (Japan)
21st-century Japanese politicians
21st-century Japanese women politicians